The Silverstone GP2 round was a GP2 Series race that ran from on the Silverstone Circuit track in Silverstone, United Kingdom.

Winners

Notes

References

GP2 Series rounds